Campina Verde is a municipality in the north of the Brazilian state of Minas Gerais.   the population was 19,752 in a total area of 3,663 km².  It became a municipality in 1938.

Location
Campina Verde is located at an elevation of 530 meters north of the Rio Grande, a tributary of the Paraná River.  It is 70 km. west of federal highway BR-153 (Transbrasiliana).  It belongs to the statistical microregion of Frutal.  Neighboring municipalities are:
Northwest: Santa Vitória
North: Ituiutaba
East and Northeast: Prata
West: Itapagibe
Southwest: Iturama
South: São Francisco de Sales
Southeast:Itapagipe and União de Minas

Distances
Belo Horizonte: 720 km.
Uberaba: 145 km.
Uberlândia: 151 km.
Ituiutaba: 185 km.

Economic activities
The most important economic activities are cattle raising, commerce, light industry, food processing, and agriculture.  The GDP in 2005 was R$181,515,000.  Campina Verde is in the top tier of municipalities in the state with regard to economic and social development.   there were 04 banking agencies in the town.  There was a dynamic retail infrastructure serving the surrounding area of cattle and agricultural lands.  In the rural area there were 1,861 establishments occupying about 4,500 workers.  530 of the farms had tractors, a ratio of one in three.   There were 2,223 automobiles in all of the municipality, about one for every 8 inhabitants.

Campina Verde is an important agricultural producer and a large producer of meat and dairy products.  There were 354,000 head of cattle in 2006, of which 55,000 head were dairy cows.  The crops with a planted area of more than 100 hectares were:
oranges: 167 ha.
corn: 5,000 ha.
soybeans: 2,500 ha.

Health and education
In the health sector there were 09 health clinics and 01 hospital with 29 beds.  In the educational sector there were 4 primary schools and 02 middle  schools.  There was 01 institute of higher learning.

Municipal Human Development Index: 0.795 (2000)
State ranking: 55 out of 853 municipalities 
National ranking: 670 out of 5,138 municipalities 
Literacy rate: 88%
Life expectancy: 74.7 (average of males and females)

The highest ranking municipality in Minas Gerais in 2000 was Poços de Caldas with 0.841, while the lowest was Setubinha with 0.568.  Nationally the highest was São Caetano do Sul in São Paulo with 0.919, while the lowest was Setubinha.  In more recent statistics (considering 5,507 municipalities) Manari in the state of Pernambuco has the lowest rating in the country—0,467—putting it in last place.

History
According to oral tradition the name of the city is linked to the cattle ranch called Fazenda Campo Belo da Farinha Podre. Before 1815 João Batista Siqueira and Bárbara Buena da Silva, took possession of a large area of lands in the region between the Rio Grande and the Paranaíba rivers.  The settlement grew and in 1923 it became a district of the municipality of Prata with the name Campina Verde.  In 1938 it got its municipal emancipation and included the districts of Iturama and São Francisco de Sales.  In 1948 Iturama was separated, being followed by  São Francisco de Sales in 1962.

References

Notable people
 

Elpídio Donizetti, Brazilian jurist, professor and judge

See also
 List of municipalities in Minas Gerais

Municipalities in Minas Gerais